Gymnastics events have been contested at every Asian Games since 1974 Asian Games in Tehran.

Editions

Events

Artistic

Rhythmic

Trampoline

Medal table

List of medalists

Best results by event and nation

See also
 Asian Gymnastics Championships

References 
Sports123

 
Sports at the Asian Games
Asian Games